Ibrahim Baylan (born 15 March 1972) is a Swedish politician who served as Minister for Schools from 2004 to 2006, as Minister for Energy from 2014 to 2019, Minister for Policy Coordination from 2016 to 2019 and as Minister for Business, Industry and Innovation from 2019 to 2021.

He has been a member of the Swedish Riksdag since 2006, and was deputy chairman in the education committée and spokesperson of educational issues for the Swedish Social Democratic Party from 2012 to 2014.

Early life and career
Ibrahim Baylan was born in Salah, a village in the Mardin Province of Southeast Turkey, and his family belongs to the Assyrian Christian people group in Turkey.

He studied economics at Umeå University and was engaged in student politics. In 1997 he became the chair of the Swedish Social Democratic Youth League in Umeå. The same year, he was elected chair of the Umeå Union of Students and also became a member of the municipal school board.

From 2000 Baylan worked as an ombudsman for the Swedish Union of Commercial Salaried Employees. He ran unsuccessfully on the Social Democratic ballot for the 2004 European Parliament election. Later in the same year, he was appointed to be Minister for School by Prime Minister Göran Persson, becoming the first non-European immigrant to become a member of a Swedish government cabinet. 2007 he was elected chairman of the Swedish parliamentary committee of transportation and communication. 2009 he became secretary general of the Swedish Social Democratic party. He resigned in March 2011.

As school minister he was involved in a controversy about a report from the Swedish National Agency for Education that was withdrawn after criticism from minister Baylan. He was reported to the Swedish Committee on the Constitution and called to a hearing on 12 April 2005.

Baylan was appointed energy minister with placement in the Ministry of the Environment at the change of government after the parliamentary elections 2014. In June 2016, he presented an agreement between the government, Moderate Party, Centre Party and the Christian Democrats on Sweden's long-term energy policy. In a government reshuffle in 2016, Baylan was also appointed coordination minister.

In September 2021, Baylan announced that he would be stepping down as minister in the autumn. He expressed it was time to try something else.

Personal life
Baylan married Anna Nilsson in Luleå in June 2006. He has two children.

References

External links
Riksdagen: Ibrahim Baylan (s)
Ibrahim Baylan – www.socialdemokraterna.se

1972 births
Living people
People from Mardin
Swedish people of Assyrian/Syriac descent
Syriac Orthodox Christians
Swedish Ministers for Industry
Members of the Riksdag from the Social Democrats
Umeå University alumni
Swedish Ministers for Energy
Swedish Ministers for Schools